Mona Ainuu is a Niuean politician and Cabinet Minister.

Prior to entering politics, Ainuu was a journalist with the Broadcasting Corporation of Niue and a Public Relations and Media Officer with the Niuean government. She was also the president of the Niue Island Volleyball Association and a founding member of the Pacific Alliance of Development Journalists.

Ainu'u was first elected to the Niue Assembly in the 2017 Niuean general election, representing the Tuapa constituency. She was subsequently appointed Member Assisting the Minister for Natural Resources. On 11 June Ainu'u was appointed Minister of Natural Resources in the Cabinet of Dalton Tagelagi.

References

Living people
Members of the Niue Assembly
Niuean women in politics
21st-century New Zealand women politicians
21st-century New Zealand politicians
Year of birth missing (living people)
Government ministers of Niue
Women government ministers of Niue